After the Fall may refer to:

Literature
 After the Fall, a review of September 11-related novels
 After the Fall (play), a 1964 play by Arthur Miller
 After the Fall (Sheckley), a 1980 book edited by Robert Sheckley
 Angel: After the Fall, a comic book series

Music
 "After the Fall", a song by Klaus Nomi from the 1982 album Simple Man
 "After the Fall" (song), a song by Journey, 1983
 "After the Fall," a song by Elvis Costello on the album Mighty Like a Rose, 1991
 After the Fall (band), an Australian musical group begun in 2000
 After the Fall (Mary Coughlan album), 1997
 After the Fall (98 Mute album), 2002
 After the Fall (After the Fall album), 2004
 After the Fall (Keith Jarrett album), 2018
 "After the Fall", a song by Trans-Siberian Orchestra from the album Beethoven's Last Night, 2012

Film and television
 After the Fall (film), a 2014 American film
 "After the Fall" (CSI episode), a CSI: Miami episode

See also
 Before the Fall (disambiguation)